Garra mamshuqa is a species of ray-finned fish in the genus Garra which is endemic to  the Wadi Hadramaut drainage in Yemen.

References 

Garra
Fish described in 1983